The Democrats is a liberal, unionist political party in Greenland.

The party is skeptical of Greenlandic independence and even further self-governance.  It has taken over this position from the Atassut party, which has developed towards favouring more autonomy. Two of the major priorities in its programme are improving educational standards and the housing situation.

History
Established in 2002, the party won five seats in the elections that year. It increased its seat total to seven in the 2005 elections, but was excluded from power by a so-called "Northern Lights Coalition" of Siumut, Inuit Ataqatigiit and Atassut. Its number of seats decreased to four seats in the 2009 elections; however, it entered a government coalition with Inuit Ataqatigiit and the Association of Candidates, removing the formerly dominant Siumut from power for the first time in its history. In the 2013 elections the party won only two seats, but gained two more seats at the  2014 elections. In the 2018 elections the party gained an additional two seats. It shrank to three in the 2021 elections.

Election results

Parliament of Greenland (Inatsisartut)

Parliament of the Kingdom of Denmark (Folketinget)

References

External links
 Official website

Greenlandic unionism
Political parties in Greenland
Liberal parties in Greenland
Social liberal parties
Political parties established in 2002